Adhikaram is a 1980 Indian Malayalam film,  directed by P. Chandrakumar and produced by R. S. Prabhu. The film stars Seema, Sukumaran, Sharada and Raghavan in the lead roles. The film has musical score by A. T. Ummer.

Cast

Seema as Geetha
Sukumaran as Rajendran
Sharada as Vimala
Raghavan as Raveendran
Sathaar as Gopan
 Thikkurisi Sukumaran Nair
 Meena as Lakshmi
Sukumari as Bhargavi Amma
Sankaradi as Advocate Bhaskara Menon
Jalaja as Rama
Kunchan as Ramu
Mala Aravindan as Appukkuttan
Nellikode Bhaskaran as Moithukka
T.M. Abraham

Soundtrack
The music was composed by A. T. Ummer and the lyrics were written by Sathyan Anthikkad.

References

External links
 

1980 films
1980s Malayalam-language films
Films directed by P. Chandrakumar